Devadhanam is a village located in back side of the Rockfort in Tiruchirappalli district. Regional Transport Office Tiruchirappalli East is located here and Registration Number TN-81.

Neighbourhoods and suburbs of Tiruchirappalli